Home Free is an American sitcom starring Matthew Perry, Marian Mercer and Diana Canova that aired on ABC from March 31, 1993 to July 2, 1993. The series was created by Tim O'Donnell and Richard Gurman.

Synopsis
Matt Bailey (Perry) is a free-spirited, if somewhat lazy, 22-year-old freelance journalist enjoying the good life at home with his indulgent mom Grace (Mercer). He wasn't so concerned about completing his ascent into full-fledged adulthood, nor was he ever in a hurry to get out on his own, until his older, recently divorced sister Vanessa (Canova) returned home with her two kids, so they could pick up the pieces and start their lives over. The unexpected arrangements forced Matt to take some crash courses in responsibility, to not only help out around the house, but to provide a good role model for his 13-year-old niece Abby (Anndi McAfee) and nephew Lucas (Scott McAfee), with whom he had a particularly close bond. Matt's struggle to maintain his wild, free-living lifestyle while facing his new realities were the focus of most episodes. His other world was the newspaper where he worked as a cub reporter, inhabited by co-worker and best friend Walter Peters (Dan Schneider), foxy photographer Laura (Brooke Theiss), to whom Matt was especially attracted; and their gruff editor, Ben Brookstone (Alan Oppenheimer).

Cast
Matthew Perry as Matt Bailey
Marian Mercer as Grace Bailey
Diana Canova as Vanessa Bailey
Anndi McAfee as Abby Bailey
Scott McAfee as Lucas Bailey
Dan Schneider as Walter Peters
Brooke Theiss as Laura 
Alan Oppenheimer as Ben Brookstone

Production

Theme song
The theme song for Home Free was a soft-rock ballad performed by Christopher Cross.

Episodes

Reception
Home Free premiered in a cushy time slot of Wednesdays at 8:30/7:30c, between The Wonder Years (which was about to end its run) and Home Improvement. After only five episodes, due to low ratings, the show was put on a five-week hiatus, which spared it from airing as a part of the important May sweeps month. The series was cancelled during May upfronts, but returned to the schedule on May 28 in the 9:30/8:30c timeslot of ABC's TGIF. Original episodes continued to air in the TGIF slot through July 2, 1993. The last two episodes of the 13-episode order were unaired.

References

External links
 

1990s American sitcoms
1993 American television series debuts
1993 American television series endings
American Broadcasting Company original programming
English-language television shows
Television series about divorce
Television series about journalism
Television series by Universal Television
TGIF (TV programming block)
Television shows set in Missouri